Finix Comics is a German comic publisher and a cooperative with the goal to continue prematurely cancelled comic-series in Germany.

Founding 
Finix Comics was founded in November 2007 by comic-enthusiasts unhappy with the situation of the publishing history of comic-series in Germany. The comic-market in Germany is not as distinct as, for example, in the United States or Japan, nor are comics considered an independently art-form or a serious entertainment medium as in France or Belgium. Therefore, comic series are more often than not prematurely cancelled in their German-language adaption; sometimes in the midst of a storyline, while the original series continues well beyond this. Existing original material thus gets not adapted further, and readers of the series are forced to buy the original comics.
For this reason, several fans grouped together and formed Finix Comics (Finix, or Finis is French for finished), to continue cancelled series. To this goal, the members of Finix obtain the rights to adapt the original material, and translate, letter, print and distribute any missing issues, continuing the series in Germany.

Statutes and members 
Finix Comics is a cooperative and a registered club, whose membership is open to anyone. Members pay a yearly membership fee of €20 (around $26 as of March 2012). Members have access to a non-public internet-forum, and may obtain any comics published by Finix for a preferential price. Furthermore, members that donate €100 or more per year, can get 10 published comics for free.
Finix Comics operates with a Board of Directors, nonetheless virtually every decision is openly discussed among the members.

The statutes, § 2 [1], say:" Zweck, Grundsätze, Bindung der Vereinsmittel
Der Verein will sich für das Kulturgut grafische Literatur (Comics) einsetzen. Insbesondere sollen unveröffentlichte und / oder vergriffene Werke in- und ausländischer Comicschaffender der Öffentlichkeit zugänglich gemacht werden".
"Purpose, principles, binding of funds
The cooperative will campaign for the cultural assets of grafic literature (comics). Especially unpublished and / or sold issues of comic-artists from the inland and foreign countries shall be made available to the public".

To date, Finix has more than 80 investors and regular members. The Board of Directors consists of Oliver-Frank Hornig, Marc Schnackers and  Oriol Schreibweis.

Publications 
Starting in 2008, Finix translated, lettered and released more than 80 titles, mainly Franco-Belgian comics like Les pionniers du nouveau monde by J.-F. Charles, Maryse Charles and Ersel; Quetzalcoatl by Jean-Yves Mitton; Buddy Longway by Derib; or Vasco by Gilles Chaillet and Frédéric Toublanc.
In 2009 the imprint Edition Solitaire was founded; Solitaire is dedicated to exclusive high-quality albums not published in German before.

Titles

2008 
 Les pionniers du nouveau monde (German: Die Pioniere der neuen Welt); by J.-F. Charles, Maryse Charles and Ersel
 L'impératrice rouge (German: Die Rote Kaiserin); by Jean Dufaux and Philippe Adamov
 Mortepierre (German: Die Füchsin); by Brice Tarval, Mohamed Aouamri and Rafa Garres
 Aberzen (German: Abersen); by Marc N'Guessan
 Violine (German: Violetta); by Tronchet, Fabrice Tarrin and Jean-Marc Krings

2009 
 Tatiana K. (German: Tatjana K.); by François Corteggiani and Félix Meynet
 Quetzalcoatl (German: Quetzalcoatl); by Jean-Yves Mitton
 Thomas Noland (German: Thomas Noland); by Daniel Pecquer and Franz
 Les innommables (German: Helden ohne Skrupel); by Yann Le Pennetier and Didier Conrad
 Malheig (German: Malheig); by Eric Stalner and Jean-Marc Stalner
 Le vent des dieux (German: Der Wind der Götter); by Philippe Adamov and Patrick Cothias
 Gorn (German: Gorn); by Tiburce Oger

2010 
 Le chant d'Excalibur (German: Excalibur); by Christophe Arleston and Eric Hübsch
 Lester Cockney (German: Lester Cockney); by Franz
 Buddy Longway (German: Buddy Longway); by Derib
 Les cosmonautes du futur (German: Die Kosmonauten der Zukunft); by Lewis Trondheim and Manu Larcenet
 Le fléau des dieux (German: Die Geissel der Götter); by Aleksa Gajić and Valérie Mangin
 Colby (German: Colby); by Greg and Michel Blanc-Dumont

2011 
 Horologiom (German: Horologiom); by Fabrice Lebeault
 Shamrock Song (German: Shamrock Song); by Franz
 La famille Martin (German: Die Müllers); by Pierre Seron
 Vasco (German: Vasco); by Gilles Chaillet and Frédéric Toublanc
 Le serment de l'ambre (German: Der Schwur des Ambers); by Dieter and Étienne Le Roux
 Black Mary (German: Black Mary); by Erwan Fagès and David Chauvel
 Spoon & White (German: Spoon & White); by Yann Le Pennetier, Jean Léturgie and Simon Léturgie

2012 
 Masquerouge (German: Der Rote Falke); by Patrick Cothias, André Juillard and Marco Venanzi
 Petit d'homme (German: Winzling); by Crisse and Marc N'Guessan
 Hauteville House (German: Hauteville House); by Fred Duval and Thierry Gioux

2013 
 Lou Cale (German: Lou Cale); by Éric Warnauts and Guy Raives
 Chroniques de la Lune Noire (German: Die Chroniken des schwarzen Mondes); by François Marcela-Froideval and Fabrice Angleraud
 Le Décalogue (German: Zehn Gebote); by Frank Giroud, Luc Révillon, Béhé, Michel Faure, Alain Mounier, Bruno Rocco, Lucien Rollin and TBC
 Jérôme K. Jérôme Bloche (German: Jackie Kottwitz); by Alain Dodier, Serge Le Tendre and Pierre Makyo
 Troll (German: Troll); by Jean David Morvan, Joann Sfar and Olivier Boiscommun
 L'Esprit de Warren (German: Warrens Schwur); by Luc Brunschwig and Servain

2014 
 I.R.$. (German: I.R.$.); by Stephen Desberg and Bernard Vrancken

Edition Solitaire 
 Le mangeur d'histoires (German: Mit fremder Feder); by Fabrice Lebeault (2009)
 Quintos (German: Quintos); by Andreas and Isabelle Cochet (2010)
 Quand souffle le vent (German: Wer Wind sät); by Laurent Galandon and Cyril Bonin (2010)
 Cryozone (German: Cryozone); by Thierry Cailleteau and Denis Bajram (2011)
 Petit miracle (German: Kleines Wunder); by Valérie Mangin and Griffo (2011)

References

External links 
 Official Homepage

Comic book publishing companies of Germany
Comics publishing companies
Bandes dessinées
German companies established in 2007